Carrizo Canyon is a canyon in San Diego County, California.

References

Valleys of San Diego County, California